Gunnar Nilsen-Vig (September 20, 1886 – July 8, 1959) was a Norwegian cinematographer, scriptwriter, and film director.

Nilsen-Vig came into contact with the director Rasmus Breistein via the company Kommunenes Filmcentral. He became Breistein's permanent cinematographer and was involved in most of Breistein's films, from Fante-Anne (1920) to Trysil-Knut (1942). He also worked as a cinematographer for other directors, including for the Norwegian–German film The Woman in the Advocate's Gown (1929, directed by Adolf Trotz). In 1923, Nilsen-Vig directed his only film, Strandhugg paa Kavringen (now considered lost), together with Trygve Dalseg.

Filmography

Cinematographer
 1920: Fante-Anne
 1921: Jomfru Trofast
 1921: Felix
 1923: Strandhugg paa Kavringen
 1926: Brudeferden i Hardanger
 1927: Madame besøker Oslo
 1929: Frøken Statsadvokat
 1930: Kristine Valdresdatter
 1931: Den store barnedåpen
 1932: En glad gutt
 1932: Skjærgårdsflirt
 1934: Syndere i sommersol
 1934: Liv
 1935: Du har lovet mig en kone!
 1938: Ungen
 1942: Trysil-Knut

Director
 1923: Strandhugg paa Kavringen

Scriptwriter
 1921: Felix
 1923: Strandhugg paa Kavringen

References

External links
 
 Gunnar Nilsen-Vig at the Swedish Film Database

Norwegian film directors
Norwegian cinematographers
1886 births
1959 deaths